James Henry Wittebols (born 1955) is a scholar of television studies, author of books on television series, and professor of communications at the University of Windsor.

Biography
Wittebols received his bachelor's degree in journalism and sociology from Central Michigan University in 1977 and an MA and PhD in sociology from Washington State University in 1979 and 1983, respectively. After several years working as an educational researcher (during which he published a highly-cited meta-analysis on class size), he became an assistant professor of communication studies at Niagara University in 1987, was promoted to full professor in 1998, and served as department chair from 1994 to 2000. He moved to the University of Windsor as professor of communication studies and department head in 2004.

Works

References

1955 births
Living people
American male writers
Central Michigan University alumni
Washington State University alumni
Academic staff of University of Windsor
Niagara University faculty